Impatiens balfourii is a species of the genus Impatiens known by the common names Balfour's touch-me-not, Kashmir balsam, and poor man's orchid. It belongs to the family Balsaminaceae.

Etymology
The Latin name Impatiens means "impatient" or "intolerant" and refers to the explosive dehiscence of the fruits, which burst at the slightest touch as a means of scattering the seeds. The Latin species epithet balfourii honors the Scottish botanist Isaac Bayley Balfour (1853-1922).

Description
This is an annual herb growing  in height. Its stem is glabrous, reddish, lined and very branched. The inflorescence is a raceme generally bearing 4 to 8 flowers.

Reproduction
The flowers are hermaphrodite, or perfect, and are pollinated by insects, or, in the Americas, by hummingbirds. The flowering period extends from July through September.

Distribution
It is native to the Himalayas, particularly Kashmir and surrounding areas, where it grows in mountains of 5,000 to 6,000 feet. It was brought back to England and many other European countries as a garden plant, and then it became popular in the San Francisco Bay Area and other parts of the United States. It can now be found growing wild as a garden escapee in Europe, on the US Pacific Coast, and in Wisconsin, where it is a restricted species because of its invasiveness.

Habitat
In the wild the plant occurs along the banks of rivers, on roadsides, and in wastelands.

Gallery

Notes

References
 Pignatti, S. Flora d'Italia. Edagricole. 1982.
 Tutin, T. G., et al. Flora Europaea, second edition. 1993.

External links
Jepson Manual Treatment
 Biolib

balfourii
Flora of the Indian subcontinent
Taxa named by Joseph Dalton Hooker